PEMAC Asset Management Association of Canada (PEMAC) is a Canadian not for profit association enabling excellence in maintenance, reliability, and asset management through collaboration, applied learning, and leadership.

History 
In 1989, the association was first established as PEMAC Plant Engineering and Maintenance Association of Canada as not-for-profit corporation. It the association was renamed PEMAC Asset Management Association of Canada in February 2020.

PEMAC Activities

Certification Program 
In an effort to establish a clear set of standards for professional development in the field of maintenance management PEMAC has set about standardizing the training for practitioners and professionals across Canada in cooperation with various Colleges, Institutes and Universities through the Maintenance Management Professional (MMP) certificate program. Individuals wishing to use the "Maintenance Management Professional" (MMP) designation must complete a 225-hour training program made up of 8 courses, apply for certification from PEMAC and be a member in good standing of the Plant Engineering and Maintenance Association of Canada.  Prior learning recognition is available for up to 6 of the courses.

PEMAC launched a second certificate program in fall 2014 that introduces tools for strategic decision making at each stage of the asset lifecycle. The Asset Management Professional (AMP) Certificate program presents participants with the latest in strategic asset management thinking from recognized global organizations, while developing the capacity to engage others and build their knowledge and skill in key subject areas such as risk management, knowledge management (enterprise database systems).

The AMP program is designed for mid-career professionals from a variety of backgrounds (IT, engineering and business management) who have responsibility for managing decisions with respect to the core life cycle functions such as design, selection, operation, and maintenance of an organization’s assets. Similar to PEMAC’s signature MMP program, the AMP program it finishes with a “Capstone” project, offering the opportunity to apply the participants' new knowledge and skills to develop a real-life project recommendation. The first set of participants completed the program in winter of 2016, and were the first in the world to be CAMP certified.

The MMP program has been recognized by Alberta Industry Training for the Blue Seal "Achievement in Business Competencies" program.  In addition both the Alberta Water Wastewater Operators Association   and the Ontario Water and Wastewater Certification Office recognize courses in the program for Continuing Education Credits. PEMAC is also recognized by the Society for Maintenance and Reliability Professionals (SMRP) as an "Approved Education Provider". Consider studying MMP or AMP courses if you are seeking to achieve -or- maintain your CMRP certification.

Chapter Activity 
Local chapters organize regular networking and professional development events across the country.

References 

Trade associations based in Canada
Professional associations based in Canada
Maintenance
Reliability engineering